Iva Majoli was the defending champion but lost in the quarterfinals to Judith Wiesner.

Martina Hingis won the title, defeating Anke Huber in the final 6–2, 3–6, 6–3. This was the first WTA title of Hingis's career.

Seeds
A champion seed is indicated in bold text while text in italics indicates the round in which that seed was eliminated. The top four seeds received a bye to the second round.

  Arantxa Sánchez Vicario (quarterfinals)
  Conchita Martínez (quarterfinals)
  Iva Majoli (quarterfinals)
  Lindsay Davenport (semifinals)
  Anke Huber (final)
  Jana Novotná (quarterfinals)
  Mary Joe Fernández (first round)
  Martina Hingis (champion)

Draw

Final

Section 1

Section 2

External links
 1996 Porsche Tennis Grand Prix Draw

Porsche Tennis Grand Prix
1996 WTA Tour